Paul Seymour Morthier Molyneux (12 January 1906 – 13 March 1980) played first-class cricket for Somerset in six matches in the 1937 season. He was born at Wells, Somerset and died at Hove, Sussex.

Molyneux was a right-handed batsman, who batted for Somerset mostly in the middle order, though in his final match he came in at No 11 in both innings. He was also a right-arm off-break bowler, but did not bowl in first-class cricket. His Somerset career was confined to a period of less than a month in 1937, and his highest score was his first-ever innings: he made 25 against Leicestershire at Leicester.

References

1906 births
1980 deaths
English cricketers
Somerset cricketers
People from Wells, Somerset